The Vienna pre-metro  tramway system, called Untergrundstrassenbahn (German for underground tramway) or sometimes abbreviated U-Strassenbahn,  USTRAB  or  USTRABA  was built on separated sections in the 1960s. The pre-metro tunnels are maintained and used by the Wiener Linien, operator of the tramway lines, and used as well by the Wiener Lokalbahnen (WLB), the operator of a regional tram-train service.

After one section close to the center of Vienna city  was converted to the modern Vienna U-Bahn system, the second section, still in the area of the south of Vienna, is still in operation as a pre-metro tramway tunnel. The following sections have been built:

Zweierlinie 

In 1980, this pre-metro line was converted to U-Bahn line U2 within two summer months, in which the tram traffic was suspended on the underground line. The platforms were elevated, the architecture of the underground tram stations was largely maintained. Since the opening of the U2 on 30 August 1980, the route is used by the U-Bahn only.

This pre-metro tunnel had a length of 1.8 km and four underground stations:
 Mariahilfer Straße, in 1991 until 2000 renamed to Babenbergerstraße, again renamed in 2000 to Museumsquartier
 Burggasse, today U-Bahn station Volkstheater and connection with U-Bahn line U3
 Lerchenfelder Straße, closed in September 2003, because of the short distance to the Volkstheater station
 Friedrich Schmidt-Platz, today U-Bahn station Rathaus (city hall); north of this station the exit of the tunnel was located at Landesgerichtsstraße

Gürtel 

The tunnels and stations of this pre-metro section are still in service. The first section, a short underpass of the Südtiroler Platz near the former Südbahnhof railway station, which had been in operation until 2009, was opened on May 7, 1959. This station is directly connected to Wien Hauptbahnhof, and is an interchange station to the U-Bahn and the S-Bahn (regional rapid transit). On December 9, 2012, the Südtiroler Platz station was renamed to Hauptbahnhof (German for Central Station). In contrast to the other stations of the  Gürtel pre-metro, white wall coverings were mounted during the renovation of this station, as well as (in a different position) a large mural (an oblique view of Vienna) from the original equipment from 1959.

This tunnel was opened in January 1969 an has a length of 3.4 kilometers. As part of the construction work a historic church, the Florianikirche, has been demolished. It was planned to convert this pre-metro to a full U-Bahn line U5 from Gumpendorfer Straße to St. Marx, but this plan has never been seriously pursued.

As part of the construction of the Matzleinsdorfer Platz station, Vienna's first moving walkway opened.

The pre-metro section under the Gürtel comprises a total of six underground stations and is used by four tram lines and the Wiener Lokalbahn service. Tram line 18 runs the longest section of the underground tram tunnel, and tram line 6 the shortest. 

Starting in 2009, all pre-metro stations, which were built in the 1960s, were refurbished, whereby the station design was aligned as far as possible with that of the U-Bahn.

Schottentor 
In 1961, at Schottentor, an underground tramway loop was built for several tramway lines. Above this facility at street level, another tramway loop for two more lines is located. Since 1980, this terminus is connected to the U-Bahn line U2.

This underground tram station is popularly called Jonas-Reindl, because of its circular, recessed, but in the middle open form, after the Austrian expression "Reindl" for casserole and the former Viennese mayor Franz Jonas. Most underground tram projects were planned and built during his reign. There were plans for an extension of this underground section to the city center in the 1960s, which have not been proceeded.

Erzherzog-Karl-Straße 
The pre-metro station Erzherzog-Karl-Straße passes under the S-Bahn station Vienna Erzherzog-Karl-Straße. This underground station, which is also served by buses, was opened in 1971 in the course of the extension of the tramway line 26. There is an elevator that leads directly to the central platform 1/2 or to the middle platform 3/4 of the S-Bahn station. There were no plans to convert this station into an U-Bahn station.

See also 
 Transportation in Vienna

References 

Standard gauge railways in Austria
Transport in Vienna
Rail transport in Vienna